Ricardo van der Velde (born 19 February 1987 in Rijsbergen) is a Dutch former racing cyclist.

Major results
2008
 1st Stage 4 Tour de l'Avenir
2009
 1st Stage 1 (TTT) Tour of Qatar
2011
 3rd International Cycling Classic

References

External links

1987 births
Living people
Dutch male cyclists
Cyclists from Zundert
Cyclists from North Brabant
20th-century Dutch people
21st-century Dutch people